Wiencourt-l'Équipée is a former railway station located in the commune of Guillaucourt in the Somme department, France.  The station was served by TER Picardie trains from Amiens to Reims and Saint-Quentin.

See also
List of SNCF stations in Hauts-de-France

Defunct railway stations in Somme (department)